Panotima copidosema is a moth in the family Crambidae. It was described by Edward Meyrick in 1934. It is found in the Democratic Republic of the Congo.

References

Moths described in 1934
Musotiminae